Nell (Hangul: 넬) is a South Korean alternative rock band formed in 2001. The band consists of lead vocalist, keyboardist and guitarist Kim Jong-wan, lead guitarist Lee Jae-kyung, bass guitarist Lee Jung-hoon and drummer Jung Jae-won. The group was named after the film, Nell, that starred Jodie Foster. Their third studio album Healing Process was chosen as one of five best recordings of the year by South Korean critics. Nell's fourth studio album Separation Anxiety was a hit in South Korea, ranking number one in various album charts.

Musical career

Early years and turning point

While performing at live clubs in Hongdae, they were picked up by Seo Taiji, and soon became the first band to promote under the record label Goesoo Indigene, a subsidiary of Seo Taiji Company in 2002. In 2006, the band decided to finish their contract with Goesoo Indigene. They signed with Woollim Entertainment.

The band is heavily influenced by numerous British bands such as Radiohead, Placebo, Travis, and Muse. They also performed a number of covers of Muse, Coldplay, Sting, and Bob Dylan during their gigs.

Nell has participated in both the 2006 and 2007 Pentaport Rock Festival of South Korea, where Placebo and Muse also performed each year.

Hiatus and comeback
After a long hiatus due to compulsory military service, they released their fifth studio album titled  on April 10, 2012, with the title track, "그리고 남겨진 것들" (The Day Before). Its music video starred Lee Min-ki and Song Jae-rim, but none of the Nell members appeared. Slip Away was a hit in South Korea, placed top rank in various album charts, such as Mnet, Bugs, and Olleh Music. Kim Jong-wan featured in G-Dragon's song "Today" in his 2012 album One of a Kind.

'Gravity' mini-album series & Japanese debut
On November 22, 2012, Nell's official homepage included a new picture signaling Nell's comeback. The picture showed a large moon that had a kind of explosion going on. Nell's new album, Holding onto Gravity was released on December 3. On December 2, 2012, Woollim's YouTube official channel released the music video for "White Night" starring Im Soo-jung.

In January 2013, Nell made their Japanese debut with the Japanese edition of Slip Away, released by Home Game Records, a Watanabe Music Publishing label dedicated to Korean rock. In May 2013, the official Woollim YouTube channel uploaded a teaser for the upcoming mini-album which was scheduled for release in June. Nell's official homepage was updated on June 3 confirming the release date for the second part of their three-part mini-album series of 'Gravity', . The music video for the mini-album's title track, "Ocean of Light", was released June 9.

2014 participation in U.S. concert and Billboard recognition

On March 11, 2014, the band performed at the second K-Pop Night Out at SXSW in Austin, Texas along with Hyuna and Jay Park and others. And on December 11, their album  was selected as number two on "Billboard's 10 Best K-Pop Albums of 2014" by Billboard K-Town with the write-up, "The strongest rock album of the year, Newton's Apple highlights Nell's vocalist/chief composer Kim Jong Wan's clever and honest songwriting skills, best heard on the single "Four Times Around the Sun" and "Grey Zone"....All the lyrics are wrapped in warm, lush arrangements and instrumentals that enchant the listener simply by themselves."

2016: Space Bohemian 
On March 22, 2016, it was announced that Nell ended their contract with Woolim Entertainment and set up an independent record label named Space Bohemian. On August 18, 2016, they released their first album with their new label, "C" with the title song Dream Catcher.

Members
Kim Jong-wan (김종완) – vocals, guitar, keyboard, drums
Lee Jae-kyung (이재경) – lead guitar
Lee Jung-hoon (이정훈) – bass guitar, tambourine, keyboard, chorus
Jung Jae-won (정재원) – drums

Discography

Studio albums

Extended plays

Single albums

Singles

Other charted songs

Soundtrack appearances

Awards and nominations

References

External links 

 

South Korean indie rock groups
Musical groups established in 1999
Musical groups from Seoul
MAMA Award winners
Korean Music Award winners
Melon Music Award winners
1999 establishments in South Korea